Toberman is a surname. Notable people with the surname include:

Charles E. Toberman (1880–1981), American real estate developer and stenographer, nephew of James
James R. Toberman (1836–1911), American politician

See also
C.E. Toberman Estate
Oberman
Toberman House